The 1975 Kansas State Wildcats football team represented Kansas State University in the 1975 NCAA Division I football season.  The team's head football coach was Ellis Rainsberger, in his first of three years at the helm of the Wildcats.  The Wildcats played their home games in KSU Stadium.  1975 saw the wildcats finish with a record of 3–8, and a dismal 0–7 record in Big Eight Conference play.

1975 was the first time in school history that the Wildcats were shut out three times in one season; the other time was in 1980.  The Wildcats were shut out by Texas A&M, Kansas, Nebraska.

Schedule

Roster

References

Kansas State
Kansas State Wildcats football seasons
Kansas State Wildcats football